Dælivannet is a lake in Bærum, Akershus county, Norway. It lies just beneath the Kolsås hill on the East side. The lake contains perch and pike and has a rich bird life.

The lake has been the subject of paintings and sketches by many significant artists including, Claude Monet, Eilif Peterssen and Christian Skredsvig (1854–1924), whose painting Seljefløiten shows a boy playing the flute by the South-East side of Dælivannet.

References
 Technical data taken from The Norwegian Water Resources and Energy Directorate (NVE) (Official English site)

Bærum
Lakes of Viken (county)